Lucha Corpi is a Chicana poet and mystery writer.  She was born on April 13, 1945 in Jaltipan, Veracruz, Mexico.  In 1975 she earned a B.A. in comparative literature from the University of California, Berkeley. In 1979 she earned a M.A. in comparative literature from San Francisco State University.  Corpi's most important contribution to Chicano literature, a series of four poems called "The Marina Poems ," appeared in the anthology The Other Voice: Twentieth-Century Women's Poetry in Translation, which was published by W. W. Norton & Company, in 1976.

She tends to write her short stories in English and her poems in Spanish.

Personal life and career

Corpi's family was from the southern part of Veracruz. Her paternal grandparents were Italian, Hispanic with Native American ancestry; of her maternal grandparents, one was surnamed Constantino and the other was three-quarters Mexican. Her family insisted she and her six sisters and two brothers all be educated. Her elder brother would not attend school without her, which explanation led to an agreement with the school allowing her to sit in the back of the classroom.

In 1964 she married Guillermo Hernández and they immigrated to the United States so that he could study at the University of California at Berkeley.  They divorced in 1970 and she started taking classes at the University of California at Berkeley where she got her BA in comparative literature.

In 1969, divorced and with a small child, she began writing poetry; her first publication was in a Norton anthology, followed by work in an anthology with other Mexican writers.

From 1970-71 she was the vice-chair of Chicano Studies executive committee at University of California, Berkeley.  From 1970-72 she was the coordinator of Chicano Studies Library.  She is a founding member, Aztlán Cultural  and Centro Chicano de Escritores.  She is a member of the Oakland Museum and Latin American Commission.

Selected works 
 Fireflight: Three Latin American Poets, With Elsie Alvarado de Ricord and Concha Michel, Oyez, 1976.
 Palabras de mediodia/Noon Words, Fuego de Aztlan, 1980 
 Delia's Song, Arte Publico, 1989 
 Eulogy For A Brown Angel : A Mystery Novel, Arte Publico, 1992 
 Cactus Blood, Arte Publico, 1995 
 Where Fireflies Dance, Children's Book Press, 1997 
 Black Widow's Wardrobe, Arte Publico, 1999 
 Crimson Moon, Arte Publico, 2004 
 Death at Solstice, Arte Publico, 2009

Reception of works
Corpi's books have received mixed reviews.  
Publishers Weekly called Palabras de mediodia/Noon Words "her dawn." With Eulogy For A Brown Angel : A Mystery Novel, Kirkus Reviews wrote "Corpi brings a Chicana feminist perspective to the mystery genre and does so with enough originality to overcome some stilted and murky writing." and "Awkward and slow moving at times, but still worthwhile mystery-reading." and Publishers Weekly wrote "A haze of dazzlingly evocative prose very nearly hides this first mystery's slack plotting. Corpi's ear for Latino rhythms and her feminist leanings produce some original and highly charged narrative moments. But plot still matters." but then concludes "Although careful readers might anticipate the solution and wish for a few more suspects, Corpi expands the genre with this work of small triumphs."

Kirkus Reviews was critical of Cactus Blood, calling it "A well-nigh impenetrable
mystery full of stilted dialogue, murky scene-setting, wild poetry, and furious evocations of the 1973 grape boycott and 1989 Oakland earthquake." while Publishers Weekly wrote "Corpi writes convincingly about Gloria's attempts to interpret her visions and does a fine job depicting decent people handling dangerous situations. But many moments of harking-back and a rash of coincidences slow the narrative."

Awards 
 National Endowment for the Arts creative writing fellowship in 1979
 First place in the Palabra Nueva literary competition for her short story, "Los cristos del alma," in 1983
 First place in the Chicano Literary Contest held at the University of California, Irvine, in 1984
 Her first mystery novel, Eulogy for a Brown Angel, which won the Multicultural Publishers Exchange Best Book of Fiction award in 1992.
 PEN Oakland Josephine Miles Literary Prize in fiction
 Named poet laureate at Indiana University Northwest

References

External links
 

American women novelists
Hispanic and Latino American novelists
20th-century American women writers
Living people
20th-century American novelists
1945 births
Mexican emigrants to the United States
Writers from Veracruz
American mystery writers
Women mystery writers
20th-century American poets
American women poets
UC Berkeley College of Letters and Science alumni
San Francisco State University alumni
National Endowment for the Arts Fellows
21st-century American women